Street Arabs in the Area of Mulberry Street is a black and white photograph taken by Danish American photographer Jacob Riis, probably in 1890. The designation of street arabs was given back then to homeless children. Riis took several pictures of these children, during the journalistic and photographic work that led to the publication of his landmark book How the Other Half Lives (1890), where they were published with the title of Street Arabs in Sleeping Quarters.

History and description
In the late 19th century there were a large number of homeless children in the streets of New York. Some of the children who lived in the streets often had families but rather sleep on the street, since they often hadn't space in the tenements. In the current photograph, taken in Mulberry Street, there are three children apparently sleeping, near an heated vent at the bottom floor of a tenement. The names or occupations of the children are unknown but they were of poor condition like it can be deduced from their poor clothings and from the fact that two of them are barefoot, and sleep one in the top of the other. This photograph was taken in daylight and it appears staged by the author, like others similar in nature. It nevertheless achieves is purpose to illustrate poverty and homelessness in children.

Riis used these images to attract the public interest of the upper classes of New York for the poor conditions of the lower classes and to help them to improve their condition. The photographs of poor or homeless children were often particularly poignant and moving to achieve that purpose.

Cultural references
The scene depicted in the photograph was recreated in the fourth episode of the TV series The Alienist (2018), set in the late 19th century.

Public collections
There is a print of this photograph at the Museum of the City of New York.

References

1890 works
1890 in art
Photographs by Jacob Riis
1890s photographs
Black-and-white photographs